Shaw Branch may refer to:

Shaw Branch (Flat River), a stream in Missouri
Shaw Branch (Osage River), a stream in Missouri